John Neptune may refer to:

 Old John Neptune (1767–1865), Native American religious and political leader
 John Kaizan Neptune (born 1951), American flautist